New Fish Creek is an unincorporated community in northern Alberta within the Municipal District of Greenview No. 16, located  west of Highway 49,  northeast of Grande Prairie.

Localities in the Municipal District of Greenview No. 16